"Plus jamais" is a song by French-Malian singer Aya Nakamura featuring vocals from British rapper Stormzy. It was released as the third single from her album Aya.

Charts

Weekly charts

Year-end charts

Certifications

References

2020 singles
2020 songs
Aya Nakamura songs
Songs written by Aya Nakamura
SNEP Top Singles number-one singles